Admiral James McEdward O'Brien, 3rd Marquess of Thomond, GCH (1769–1855), styled Lord James O'Brien from 1809 to 1846, was a British naval officer.

O'Brien, born in 1769, was third son of Edward Dominic O'Brien, captain in the army (d. 1801). His mother was Mary Carrick, and his uncle, Murrough O'Brien, was first Marquess of Thomond. He inherited his title on the death of his brother William O'Brien, 2nd Marquess of Thomond

Naval career
As a captain's servant, he entered the navy on 17 April 1783 on board , stationed in the Channel. As a lieutenant he joined, in succession, on the home station, second-rate , the 38-gun fifth-rate , and the 74-gun . In the latter ship he was present in William Cornwallis' celebrated retreat, 16 and 17 June 1795. On 5 December 1796 he was promoted to the command of the 14-gun sloop . From 1800 to 1804 he commanded  on the West Indies station, where, on 24 June 1803, he made a prize of L'Enfant Prodigue, a French national schooner of sixteen guns, and in the spring of 1804 distinguished himself in forwarding the supplies at the capture of Surinam, as well as by defeating a projected expedition by the enemy against Antigua.

On 29 November 1809 he was granted a Royal Warrant of Precedence as if his father had succeeded to the marquisate of Thomond, and was henceforth known as Lord James O'Brien. He became a rear-admiral in 1825, a vice-admiral in 1837, a full admiral on 13 May 1847, and an Admiral of the Red in 1853. On the accession of William IV, he was made a lord of the bedchamber, and nominated G.C.H. on 13 May 1831. He succeeded his brother, William O'Brien, on 21 August 1846 as the third Marquess of Thomond.

He died at his residence, near Bath, Somerset, on 3 July 1855, and was buried in the catacombs of St. Saviour's Church, Walcot, Bath, on 10 July.

Family
He married, first, on 25 November 1800, Eliza Bridgman, second daughter of James Willyams of Carnanton, Cornwall (she died on 14 February 1802); secondly, in 1806, while in the West Indies, Jane, daughter of Thomas Ottley, and widow of Valentine Horne Horsford of Antigua (she died on 8 September 1843); and, thirdly, on 5 January 1847, at Bath, Anne, sister of Sir C. W. Flint, and widow of Rear-Admiral Francis William Fane.

O'Brien left no issue, and the marquessate of Thomond and the earldom of Inchiquin became extinct, but the barony of Inchiquin devolved to the heir male, Sir Lucius O'Brien, Bt, who became thirteenth Baron Inchiquin on 3 July 1855.

See also

References

 

|-

|-

1769 births
1855 deaths
Royal Navy admirals
Royal Navy personnel of the French Revolutionary Wars
Royal Navy personnel of the Napoleonic Wars
James
18th-century Irish people
19th-century Irish people
Marquesses of Thomond
Irish chiefs of the name